Acacia recurvata, commonly known as the recurved wattle, is a shrub of the genus Acacia and the subgenus Plurinerves that is endemic to a small area of western Australia.

Description
Like most species of Acacia it has phyllodes rather than true leaves. It blooms in July and produces yellow flowers. The simple inflorescences have spherical flower-heads with a diameter of  containing 18 to25 golden coloured flowers.

Distribution
It is native to a small area in the Mid West  region of Western Australia where it is commonly situated on breakaways, low hills and plains and along creeks growing in sandy-clay or clay-loam soils based on granite. The limited range of the plant extends from around Coorow in the south to around Three Springs in the north usually as a part of shrubland or open ''Eucalyptus wandoo woodland communities.

See also
 List of Acacia species

References

recurvata
Acacias of Western Australia
Taxa named by Bruce Maslin
Plants described in 1999
Taxa named by Richard Sumner Cowan